This page summarises the Champions Path matches of 2018–19 UEFA Europa League qualifying phase and play-off round.

Times are CEST (UTC+2), as listed by UEFA (local times, if different, are in parentheses).

Second qualifying round

Summary

|+Champions Path

|}

Matches

The New Saints won 3–2 on aggregate.

Torpedo Kutaisi won 7–0 on aggregate.

Zrinjski Mostar won 3–2 on aggregate.

Valur won 3–1 on aggregate.

Alashkert won 1–0 on aggregate.

F91 Dudelange won 3–2 on aggregate.

Spartaks Jūrmala won 9–0 on aggregate.

APOEL won 5–2 on aggregate.

Olimpija Ljubljana won 6–2 on aggregate.

Third qualifying round

Summary

|+Champions Path

|}

Matches

Ludogorets Razgrad won 2–1 on aggregate.

F91 Dudelange won 4–3 on aggregate.

CFR Cluj won 7–0 on aggregate.

Olimpija Ljubljana won 7–1 on aggregate.

2–2 on aggregate. Sheriff Tiraspol won on away goals.

Rosenborg won 5–0 on aggregate.

Sūduva Marijampolė won 1–0 on aggregate.

Midtjylland won 5–1 on aggregate.

APOEL won 5–3 on aggregate.

Torpedo Kutaisi won 5–4 on aggregate.

Play-off round

Summary

|+Champions Path

|}

Matches

Spartak Trnava won 3–1 on aggregate.

1–1 on aggregate. Astana won 2–1 on penalties.

Rosenborg won 5–1 on aggregate.

F91 Dudelange won 5–2 on aggregate.

Celtic won 4–1 on aggregate.

Qarabağ won 3–1 on aggregate.

Malmö FF won 4–2 on aggregate.

Ludogorets Razgrad won 5–0 on aggregate.

Notes

References

External links

1C
UEFA Europa League qualifying rounds